Ricochet is the second album, by the Nitty Gritty Dirt Band, and their second album release of 1967, being released only four or five months after their first album, The Nitty Gritty Dirt Band, which was released in February or March, 1967.  It appears that this album may have been released rather quickly after their first album because that album had been only the second Liberty Records release of 1967 to make the Billboard Top Pop Albums chart, the first being Gary Lewis & the Playboys You Don't Have to Paint Me a Picture LP, which charted in February. Ricochet failed to make the charts.

Track listing
"Shadow Dream Song" (Jackson Browne) – 3:50
"Ooh Po Pe Do Girl" (Jeff Hanna) – 3:20
"Coney Island Washboard" (Hampton Durand, Jerry Adams, Ned Nestor, Claude Shugart) – 3:43
"Put a Bar in My Car" (Reverend Gary Davis, Beasley Smith) – 3:08
"It's Raining Here in Long Beach" (Jackson Browne) – 3:36
"I'll Search the Sky" (Jeff Hanna) – 3:14
"Truly Right" (Michael Brewer, Tom Shipley) – 3:27
"Tide of Love" (Greg Copeland, Steve Noonan) – 3:06
"Happy Fat Annie" (Bruce Kunkel) – 4:35
"I'll Never Forget What's Her Name" (Harvey Gerst, I. Michael Kollander) – 3:45
"Call Again" (Bruce Kunkel) – 3:45
"The Teddy Bear's Picnic" (John Walter Bratton, Jimmy Kennedy) – 3:45

Personnel
Nitty Gritty Dirt Band
Jeff Hanna – guitar, mandolin, washboard, vocals
Jimmie Fadden – guitar, harmonica, washtub bass, vocals
Ralph Barr – guitar, clarinet, vocals
Les Thompson – guitar, mandolin, vocals
Bruce Kunkel – guitar, kazoo, vocals
John McEuen – banjo, guitar, mandolin, washtub bass
Technical
Armin Steiner - engineer
John Stewart - photography

About the songs
"Shadow Dream Song" was written by Jackson Browne years before his first album. The music features a fast, high guitar pattern, with violin playing long notes over it, and a drum filling in the spaces. A flute adds accents in places. The lyrics describe events with and feeling about a girl in the court of princess and a prince. He describes her as "a laughing, dappled shadow".

"Ooh Po Pe Do Girl" was written by band member Jeff Hanna. This is a 12 bar blues. Jimmie Fadden's harmonica plays over piano, guitar, and drums, with harmonica & guitar solos at break. The lyrics praise and woo the Ooh Po Pe Do Girl.

"Coney Island Washboard" was written in 1926, and is played here in that style. The song features a solos by washboard, banjo, scat vocal, kazoo, and washtub bass. The lyrics are about a woman who plays music on the washboard while doing laundry on the Coney Island Boardwalk.

"Put a Bar in My Car" lyric complain that everything is going wrong, so "I'm going to drive myself to drink". It has a double vocal. Guitar and drum provide most of the music. Harmonica plays over the second half.

"It's Raining Here in Long Beach" was written by Jackson Browne. It starts like a slow dirge with a Ringo like vocal. The second half speeds up like 20s popular song. The lyrics caution that while Long Beach can be fun, you can't afford to live there. Banjo is the dominant instrument.

"I'll Search the Sky" has a funky riff behind the verses. The first verse is guitars, the second verse adds horns. The choruses and final verse include violin. The lyrics speak with regret and yearning for the "bird" who came, stayed for a while, but eventually flew off on her own.

"Truly Right" was written by Michael Brewer and Tom Shipley, who recorded it themselves the next year for their first album 'Down in L. A.. They are best known for their 1970 top 10 hit "One Toke Over the Line". The music is acoustic guitars, banjo, drums, and tambourine, with two vocalist. The lyrics admit that he let a relationship slip away that was "right as rain".

"Tide of Love" was written by Steve Noonan and Greg Copeland who wrote the hit "Buy For Me the Rain" on the first NGDB album. The tune is a ballad featuring a string quartet, guitar, and oboe. The lyrics asks the object of his affection to join him in appreciation of the beauty in nature and to love him now, simply, without undue concern for the uncertain future.

"Happy Fat Annie" was written by band member Bruce Kunkel and is another 1920s style song. The music is kazoos and banjo with tempo alternating between fast and slow. The lyrics sing of Annie's charms and ask for one more try.

"I'll Never Forget What's Her Name" was written by Harvey Gerst and Mike Kollander who were contemporary songwriters. The songs starts with a guitar intro, which is repeated in the middle. The rest of the song choppy quarter notes on piano and drum. A trombone adds some accent notes. The lyrics are one long joke, I can't remember anything about you, but I can't forget you.
 
"Call Again" was written by band member Bruce Kunkel. The song has a Ringo Starr vibe with drums up front. Guitar is accompanied by violin and flute. The lyric implore you to disregard the thoughtless thing he may have said or done, and please call again.
 
"The Teddy Bear's Picnic" was written in the 1930s and has been recorded many times. This version features silly vocals that sound like the Munchkins from The Wizard of Oz. The main lyrics are sung by Les Thompson in a normal voice.

Discography
Nitty Gritty Dirt Band discography

References
All information is from the album liner notes, unless otherwise noted.

Nitty Gritty Dirt Band albums
1967 albums
Liberty Records albums